The McNaughton Park Trail Runs, over distances of 50, 100, 150 and , is an annual ultramarathon running event held in Pekin, Illinois each spring on a rugged, ten-mile (16 km) loop course.  All four races are run concurrently. The 150 and  ultra are the only ones of that distance held in Illinois.

The loop course is primarily a single lane footpath, through natural countryside including forests and meadows.

A thirty-mile run, part of the event through 2006, was replaced by a  option beginning in 2007.

Records
Men
30 Mile (no longer held): Paul Stofko 3:58:18 2005
50 Mile: Eric Grossman 6:52:34 2004
100 Mile: Karl Meltzer 17:40:13 2007
150 Mile: David Goggins 33:36:20 2008

Women
30 Mile (no longer held): Ellen Erhardt 4:35:34 2004
50 Mile: Jane Moser Cox 9:28:01 2005
100 Mile: Tracy Thomas 23:27:26 2006
150 Mile: Charlotte Vasarhelyi 46:21:29 2008

External links
PotawatomiTrailRuns.com - Official web site

Ultramarathons in the United States
Track and field in Illinois